Gregory Bruce Lambert (born 1 March 1947) is a former Australian rules footballer who played with South Melbourne in the Victorian Football League (VFL).

Lambert came to South Melbourne from Corowa. He spent most of his career as a back pocket defender and wingman. He transferred to VFA club Dandenong after his stint in the VFL.

He captain-coached Mt Eliza to a premiership in 1983.

References

1947 births
Australian rules footballers from New South Wales
Sydney Swans players
Corowa Football Club players
Dandenong Football Club players
Living people